Apronianus may refer to:
 Gaius Vipstanus Apronianus, Roman senator and proconsul of Africa in the 1st century AD
 Cassius Apronianus, Roman senator in the 2nd century AD, son-in-law of the historian Dio Chrysostom
 Apronianus, whom Cassius Dio tells us was governor of the province of Asia in 203 AD. He was unjustly condemned to death in his absence. (Cassius Dio, Roman History 76.8)
 Turcius Rufius Apronianus Asterius, aristocrat during the reign of Theoderic the Great, and Roman consul in 494